The Al Ansaar Mosque is a mosque in Portsmouth, Saint John Parish, Dominica.

History
The mosque was funded and established in 2004 by the students of Ross University School of Medicine and their families.

See also
 Islam in Dominica

References

2004 establishments in Dominica
Islam in Dominica
Mosques completed in 2004
Religious buildings and structures in Dominica
Saint John Parish, Dominica